Lobsang Sandan (Tibetan: བློ་བཟང་བསམ་གཏན་, Chinese:达拉·洛桑三旦, 1933-1985), one of the three reincarnated rinpoches in one family, is the third brother of the 14th Dalai Lama. He is 2 years older than the 14th Dalai Lama, he was recognized as 16th Ngari Rinpoche.  

Lobsand Sandan once lied about the 14th Dalai Lama and it was confirmed by Ngapoi Ngawang Jigme and the 14th Dalai Lama.

On 20 April 1956, Lobsang Sandan was appointed as a member of the Preparatory Committee of the Tibet Autonomous Region and served as the deputy director of the Public Security Department

References

1933 births
 1985 deaths